The 1924 East Tennessee State Normal School football team was an American football team that represented East Tennessee State Normal School—now known as East Tennessee State University (ETSU)—as an independent in the 1924 college football season. They were led by third-year head coach James Karl Luck.

Schedule

References

East Tennessee State Normal
East Tennessee State Buccaneers football seasons
East Tennessee State Normal football